{
  "type": "FeatureCollection",
  "features": []
}Al-Ma'sarah, also spelled Maasarah or Masarah, is a city in Dakhla Oasis, Egypt.

Overview
With a population of about 5,000 inhabitants, Al-Ma'sarah is a village in Dakhla Oasis. The town lies on the western desert of Egypt

Local industries include a phone company and cement making. The area also has hot sulphur springs.

New Valley Governorate